Oh, My God! is a 2006 album by Linda Sundblad.

Track listing
Intro
Cheat
Oh Father
Pretty Rebels
Lose You
Back in Time
Who (Q-Boy)
Dirty
Turning On
Beautiful Boys
Keeper
Daises
Outro

Chart positions

References

2006 albums
Linda Sundblad albums